The Fichtel Mountains, form a small horseshoe-shaped mountain range in northeastern Bavaria, Germany. They extend from the valley of the Red Main River to the Czech border, a few foothills spilling over into the Czech Republic. They continue in a northeasterly direction as the Elster Mountains, and in a southeasterly direction as the Upper Palatine Forest.

Etymology

The first person to write about the Fichtel Mountains, Matthias of Kemnath (actually Matthias Widmann, born 23 February 1429 in Kemnath) reported in 1476: Ein bergk, hoch, weitt, wolbekant ligt in Beiern, gnant der Fichtelberg ("A mountain, high, wide and well-known, lies in Bavaria, known as the Fichtelberg"). In descriptions of the border in 1499 and 1536, the mountain that is now called the Ochsenkopf was called Vichtelberg; thereafter the name was extended to the whole mountain region. It is also mentioned in old documents: around 1317 the lords of Hirschberg were enfeoffed inter alia with the walt zu dem Vythenberge. By the 14th century iron ore was being extracted in the St. Veith Pit on the southern foot of the mountain. Vyth → Veit → Fichtel. High-profile local history and name researchers have still not had the last word.

Geography

The Fichtel Mountains lie between the towns of Hof and Weiden. In the west there is a good transport link to the nearby city of Bayreuth.

The county town in the heart of the Fichtel Mountains is Wunsiedel with its famous Luisenburg Rock Labyrinth. Other main settlements are Marktredwitz, Marktleuthen, Arzberg, Röslau, Weißenstadt, Waldershof, Kirchenlamitz and Tröstau (all on the upper reaches of the Ohře/Eger and the Röslau rivers). The largest settlement in the Czech part of the Fichtel Mountains is Aš.

Further to the southeast and south are Bischofsgrün, Fichtelberg, Mehlmeisel, Nagel, Neusorg, Speichersdorf, Kemnath, Erbendorf, Wiesau and Fuchsmühl, in the west are Weidenberg, Creußen, Bayreuth, Goldkronach, Bindlach and Bad Berneck, in the northwest are Gefrees, Zell im Fichtelgebirge, Weißdorf, Münchberg (Obere Saale), and in the north Selb, Rehau and Hof.

The boundary between the (East) Franconian dialect in the north and west and the (North) Bavarian and Upper Palatine dialects in the east and south runs diagonally through the Fichtel from northeast to southwest. This language border does not coincide with the administrative boundary of Upper Franconia and the Upper Palatinate, but, for example, Bavarian is also spoken in the Upper Franconian district of Wunsiedel.
Moreover, there are descendants of those who, after the World War II came from Bohemia, Moravia, Silesia and East Prussia into the Fichtel Mountains, and who make up a significant percentage of the population.

Geomorphology

In terms of geomorphological division of Germany, the Fichtel Mountains forms a major natural region called the Thuringian-Franconian Highlands (no. D48 and 39) together with the Thuringian Forest, Thuringian Highland and Franconian Forest. In terms of geomorphological division of the Czech Republic, the Fichtel Mountains is a mesoregion within the Ore Mountains Highlands together with Ore Mountains and Elbe Sandstone Mountains.

Geomorphologically the Fichtel Mountains are a horseshoe-shaped massif consisting of several linked ridges, hence the term Fichtel Mountain Horseshoe (Fichtelgebirgs-Hufeisen). The most important are the:

 High Fichtel with the Schneeberg, Ochsenkopf and Kösseine massif,
 Northern ridge of Waldstein including the mountains of Großer Waldstein, Epprechtstein and Kornberg
 Southern section with its Steinwald and Reichsforst forests and the Kohlberg mountain
 Inner Fichtel Plateau.

To the northeast the Fichtel Mountains transitions into the Elster Mountains and the Ore Mountains, to the southeast is the Upper Palatine Forest, the Bohemian Forest and the Bavarian Forest. To the northwest is a clear geological divide with the Franconian and Thuringian Forests. To the southwest it descends to the morphologically very different Franconian fault-block landscape.

In early times the Fichtel was known as the 'navel of Germany' (Nabel Deutschlands) or the 'wellspring of Europe' (Herzbrunnen Europas) because four important rivers rise here and flow in four different directions of the compass:

 to the north flows the Saxon Saale
 to the east flows the Ohře, known here as the Eger and its tributary, the Röslau
 to the south two headstreams of the Naab: the Fichtelnaab in the centre and the Haidenaab to one side
 to the west the White Main
Numerous moors and marshes, which are now protected, are valuable water collectors. The European watershed from the North Sea to the Black Sea runs over these mountains.

Mountains and hills 
Rivers rising from the Fichtel Mountains are the White Main, the Saxon Saale, the Ohře/Eger and the Fichtelnaab which later joins the Waldnaab. Major towns on the edge of the mountain region are Bayreuth and Hof.

While the mountains dip gradually away to the north and the south, they form a steep slope in the west where the Red Main forms the boundary of the mountains.

There are two chair-lifts to the summit, one from Bischofsgrün in the north and one from Fleckl in the south. The "Asenturm" (Æsir Tower) is an observation tower on the summit with a restaurant attached.

The following are the highest and best-known mountains in the Fichtel Mountains (listed with heights in metres (m) above sea level (NN):

Geology

Early mountain building 

Geologically the Fichtel massif consists mainly of granite. The history of its orogeny begins in the Precambrian Eon about 750–800 million years ago. From that time only the truncated uplands of the once-towering mountain chain are left.

Subsequently, the area was covered by sea, and rivers transported sediments from the old eroding mountains on the coast. These sediments were deposited as layers of clay, sand and limestone.

At the beginning of the Cambrian Period, about 570 million years ago, these beds were folded and raised up to form new mountains. High temperatures and pressure during this mountain folding process, which lasted into the Upper Carboniferous Period, created metamorphic rock. The shale layers were transformed into phyllites and schists, sandstones metamorphosed into quartzite and limestone produced Wunsiedel marble. These mountains, which may have been several kilometres high, were also eroded to sea level again.

Variscan orogeny: mountains from the depths of the sea 
In the next phase, great, deep-sea sediments were laid down under the present-day Fichtel Mountains and the Franconian Forest from the Silurian, Devonian and Lower Carboniferous periods; these are especially well recorded in the Franconian Forest, whose rocks were only subject to very low-grade metamorphism (associated with volcanism and ore formation) and which contain easily dated fossils. Finally, in the Upper Carboniferous period 285 million years ago, the Hercynian mountain building phase began and raised the Fichtel Mountains, Franconian Forest and Münchberg gneiss plateau into high mountains – like almost all the fold mountains formed during the Hercynian period.
This mountain building episode was the Variscan orogeny, named after Hof's Latin name (and the tribe of Varisci) of Curia variscorum. At the same time, magma intruded in several phases into the folds, where it solidified under the Earth's surface into the present-day granites. As granite formed, secondary rocks were only affected by slight contact metamorphism. The rest of the molten rock with its ore-containing fluids formed pegmatite, as well as veins of ore and minerals – the basis of the medieval mining industry and early industrialisation of this region.

During the Upper Carboniferous and Lower Permian (Rotliegendes) large quantities of rock debris were deposited in intramontane basins and onto the foreland of the mountain range. These basins were formed by extensional tectonics which were accompanied by an intermediate to acidic volcanism. The sediments of the Rotliegendes are only exposed in a few places, but have been confirmed across a wide area by drilling beneath the platform southwest of the Franconian Line. Late Variscan volcanic rocks occur in the Fichtel Mountains as layers of rhyolite.

Alpine orogeny creates new pressures 
In the neogene (Upper Tertiary beginning 26 million years ago) period, tectonic activity increased again – just as the Alpine orogeny (Alps, Carpathians etc.) slowly came to an end. In that time, parts of this and other older massifs (such as the Bohemian-Moravian Highlands or Bohemian Massif in the Alpine foothills) sometimes ended up underneath younger rock. In the Upper Miocene (10 million years ago), molten basalt broke through in northern Upper Palatinate as the Eger Graben was being formed. Through erosion, the remains of former diatremes have been uncovered and may be seen e.g. on the Rauher Kulm or at Parkstein near Weiden. Basaltic surface layers, i.e. extensive flows of low-viscosity lava, are visible e. g. on the Teichelberg near Pechbrunn. These basaltic nappes should not however be confused with the formation of tectonic layers.

The formation of the present landscape finally took place in the younger Pliocene about 5 million years ago: an earlier-formed Franconian fault line came under pressure again and the Fichtel Mountains, Franconian Forest, the Münchberg Gneiss Massif and the northern Upper Palatine Forest were uplifted along it. This last uplift gave the forces of erosion more to do again and the rivers cut deeply into the already, almost levelled, mountain range. So the present day structure was created from a plateau: a low mountain range which is being gnawed away at on all sides, with a long and varied history. Although often difficult to interpret, it is an 'Eldorado' for geologists from a wide range of specialisms.

Predominant rock types 
Granite ( for grain) and its derivatives
make up about 40% of the area – its impact being all the more striking because this very hard, yet hydrous, rock forms the highest peaks in the area. Its stark appearance and the early emergency of industry here have made their mark on landscape and people.

In detail there is:
 Porphyritic Granite of the Weißenstadt/Liebenstein massif (including the towns of Marktleuthen/Röslau) and extending into the Czech Republic as far as Haslau. The porphyry contains biotite (dark mica) and phenocrysts of feldspar up to 8 cm across.
 Reut Granite near Gefrees is, by contrast, finer with a bluish-grey hue. Selb Granite (found northeast of the upper massif near Schwarzenhammer and running through the Selb Forest and the Czech Republic into Saxony/ Elster Mountains) is fine-grained, but grey again.
 Holzmühl Granite occurs in just two small outcrops near Holzmühl, 3 km southeast of Marktleuthen and near Längenau on the Wartberg, east-northeast of Selb; medium-grained with a higher biotite content, unevenly grained microstructure.
 Redwitzite is also called Syenite Granite and occurs in the Marktredwitz/Arzberg/Thiersheim triangle; medium- and also fine-grained, its variable mineral composition produces colourations from light grey, dark grey and dark green-grey to almost black.
 Rand  Granite (Dach Granite) occurs in all the prominent massifs of the Fichtel Mountains (the Ochsenkopf, the southern part of the Schneeberg and the Haberstein, the Platte to the Hohe Matze, the Kösseine and the Großer Kornberg); its groundmass is small-grained with phenocrysts of feldspar, quartz and biotite, sometimes sprinkled with muscovite as well;
 Kösseine-Rand Granite occurs on the Kösseine, including the Burgstein, Haberstein and Schauerberg, and the southern part of the Großer Kornberg massif; small- to medium-grained, porphyritic structure weak or missing; low in phenocrysts.
 Kern Granite is found in the central Fichtelberg/Ochsenkopf/Nußhardt block and on the eastern perimeter of the Schneeberg; it forms outcrops of in the shape of numerous rock formations; medium- to coarse-grained.
 Kösseine and Wolfsgarten Kern Granite. There are numerous pockets of Kösseine Granite containing hornfels, cm-large biotite-rich shreds and nodules of host rock, rounded or round quartz-feldspar rich pockets on the Kösseine massif: narrow band on the north, east and southern edge, small labyrinth, Kleinwendern quarry, Hirschensprung rock formation, Wolfstein, Hohenstein, Ochsenkopf, Hundslohe and Gregnitz valley; on the Kornberg: the Wolfsgarten forest and the south-southwestern part of the Großer Kornberg; relatively coarse, has an unusual appearance due to the blue feldspar, black biotite and richly sprinkled dark foreign bodies; Wolfsgarten Granite is somewhat lighter blue.
 Zinn Granite is restricted to the central massif and occurs on the Rudolfstein, on the Drei Brüder almost to the summit of the Schneeberg, western slope of the Seehügel, between Seehügel and Platte, Fuchsbau and Zufurt west of Leupoldsdorf; very even, medium grain; little biotite, a lot of muscovite; lighter, brighter hue.
 Rand Granite of the Steinwald massif: in the western part of the Steinwald, e. g. on the Dachsfelsen, and the  northwestern part of the Grandfelsen; small-grained.
 Steinwald Granite occurs in the centre, including the Weißenstein, Platte, Katzentrögel, Reiseneggerfelsen and Hackelstein; coarse-grained.
 Friedenfels Granite is the transitional facies between the Steinwald Granite and the Falkenberg Porphyritic Granite; it forms the basement of the Pechbrunn basalt region and surfaces there at various places between the basalt nappes; porphyritic structure, especially rich in feldspar phenocrysts.

Mining industry 
By the Early Middle Ages man had begun to mine in the Fichtel Mountains. The most important products were gold, tin, iron, minerals, earths and rock (basalt, brown coal, diabase, granite, silt, marble, soapstone, clay and peat). In earlier times uranium ore deposits were discovered. The metals were worked in hammer mills (hence the many place names ending with -hammer) on the Fichtel's rivers, in furnaces and at metalsmiths. The forests of the Fichtel Mountains supplied the wood necessary for the manufacture of charcoal. During the Thirty Years' War the mining industry became depressed and the ore deposits were largely exhausted. In the 18th century Alexander von Humboldt tried to revive the mining industry again. Many towns and villages (e. g. Wunsiedel, Weißenstadt, Arzberg, Fichtelberg-Neubau, Goldkronach) owe their emergence to the mining industry.

An insight into the history of mining in the Fichtel Mountains may be gained from:
 the visitor mine of Gleissinger Fels near Fichtelberg-Neubau
 the Schmutzler gallery near Goldkronach
 the gold mining museum in Goldkronach
 the mining exhibition in the Fichtelgebirge Museum at Wunsiedel
 the mining industry information point at Arzberg
 the local heritage and mining museum in Erbendorf

Traditions 
The Huguenots introduced the Easter decorations on wells, so-called Osterbrunnen, in the shape of a lily (emblem of the Bourbon kings) (as described e.g. in the April 2007 of the Fränkische Post).

Economy and tourism 
Although the mining industry is only of historic interest today, there are many places in the Fichtel Mountains that still produce glassware at competitive prices. The porcelain industry, centred on the town of Selb, is internationally renowned and the foremost in Germany. Local firms such as Rosenthal and Hutschenreuther are of international standing.

Tourism is the main source of income for many places in the Fichtel Mountains today. In some towns such as Bischofsgrün tourism has a long tradition going back to the 1920s. After the Second World War the stream of holidaymakers increased sharply, both in summer for walking and in winter for winter sports. The Fichtel Mountains became the local mountain range (Hausgebirge) for (West-)Berliners who, unable to holiday in East Germany, were able to get there on the transit route of the A 9 motorway. This has changed since German reunification and the opening up of other mountainous holiday areas.

The Fichtel Mountains are a nationally important holiday destination in winter. Several lifts, the longest being two chair lifts on the Ochsenkopf, but also a plethora of cut cross-country trails are the mainstay of this industry.

The Fichtel Mountains attract many tourists throughout the year.  In the winter the mountains are a common destination for people seeking outdoor recreational sports like alpine skiing, cross country skiing, and sledding.  The warmer summer months find people mountain biking, hiking, and sight seeing amongst the many large rock formations.

Settlements 

 Arzberg
 Aš
 Bad Berneck
 Bindlach
 Bischofsgrün
 Brand (Oberpfalz)
 Ebnath
 Erbendorf
 Fichtelberg
 Gefrees
 Goldkronach
 Hazlov
 Höchstädt im Fichtelgebirge
 Hranice
 Kemnath
 Krásná
 Kirchenlamitz
 Luby
 Marktleugast
 Marktleuthen
 Marktredwitz
 Marktschorgast
 Mehlmeisel
 Münchberg
 Nagel
 Neusorg
 Plesná
 Podhradí
 Rehau
 Röslau
 Schirnding
 Schönbrunn
 Schönwald
 Selb
 Skalná
 Sparneck
 Speichersdorf
 Thiersheim
 Thierstein
 Tröstau
 Waldershof
 Warmensteinach
 Weidenberg
 Weißdorf
 Weißenstadt
 Wunsiedel
 Zell im Fichtelgebirge

Approaches 
 Rail: Marktredwitz station has rail services to Eger, Regensburg, Nuremberg, Munich, Hof, Bayreuth, Dresden and Leipzig
 Road:
 Federal roads (Bundesstraßen): B 303 and B 15
 Motorways (Bundesautobahnen): A 93 and A 9
 Air: Hof-Plauen Airport

References

Sources 
 Franz X. Bogner: Das Fichtelgebirge im Luftbildportrait. Ellwanger Verlag, Bayreuth 2009 (twote Auflage). .
 Dietmar Herrmann: Vom Bergbau im Fichtelgebirge. Heft 11 und 12 der Schriftenreihe „Beiträge zur Geschichts- und Landeskunde des Fichtelgebirges“, Verlag Buchhandlung Kohler, Wunsiedel
 Dietmar Herrmann: "Rund um den Großen Waldstein im Fichtelgebirge", Heft 16/2008 der FGV-Schriftenreihe Das Fichtelgebirge, HG: Fichtelgebirgsverein, Theresienstraße 2, 95632 Wunsiedel
 Reinhard Feldrapp, Bernd Häuser: Fichtelgebirge. Streifzüge durch das granitene Hufeisen. Echter Verlag 2003, 
 Dietmar Herrmann: Lexikon Fichtelgebirge. Ackermann-Verlag, Hof, 
 Reinhard Müller, Horst Ruhl: Mit Kindern im Fichtelgebirge. Wo Wandern zum Erlebnis wird. Fleischhauer & Spohn Verlag, Bietigheim 1994, 
 Gerhard Bayerl, Manfred Schultes, Bernhard Settwon: Steinmeer und Siebenstern. Druckhaus Oberpfalz 2000, 
 Karl-Heinz Mayer: Die Forstgeschichte des Fichtelgebirges. (Dissertationsschrift.) Forstliche Forschungsberichte München, Nr. 167. Frank, München 1998, 297 (VII/XI) S.
 Fichtelgebirge, Frankenwald, Coburger Land. Vom Oberen Maintal bis zum Vogtland. HB-Verlags- und Vertriebsgesellschaft 1998 (HB Bildatlas: H.190), 
 Gernot Messarius: Fichtelgebirge. Steinwald. Bayreuth, Kulmbach, Hof. Goldstadtverlag, Pforzheim 2002 (Goldstadt Reiseführer Bd. 318), 
 Godehard Schramm, Bernd-Heinz Häuser: Fichtelgebirge-Frankenwald-Steinwald. Die schönsten Ausflugsziele. Rosenheimer Verlagshaus 1992, 
 Reinhard Feldrapp, Günter Hertel: Das Fichtelgebirge. H. Stürtz, Würzburg 1984, 
 Friedrich Wilhelm Singer, Georg Pöhlein: Fichtelgebirge. Das granitene Hufeisen. Oberfränkische Verlagsanstalt, Hof 1983, 
 Dietmar Herrmann: "Der Ochsenkopf im Fichtelgebirge", Heft 17/2009 der FGV-Schriftenreihe Das Fichtelgebirge

Maps 
 Naturpark Fichtelgebirge and Naturpark Steinwald. Walking map with tourist tips, coloured path marking and car parks for walkers.. Official walking map of the Fichtelgebirge Club and Fichtelgebirge Nature Park 1:50.000 16th edn. Fritsch Landkarten-Verlag Hof (Fritsch Karten: No. 52) o. J.,

External links 

 The Fichtelgebirge, described by a resident of Franconia 
 Official Fichtelgebirge tourist portal 
 Fichtelgebirge holiday country 
 Information portal 
 Official presentation of Czech part of the Fichtel Mountains 
 Homepage of the 'Fichtelgebirgsverein' 
 Fichtel Mountains in Oberfanken 

 
Mountain ranges of Bavaria